Water polo has been contested at the Asian Games since 1951 in New Delhi, India.

Summary

Men

Women

Medal table

Participating nations

Men

Women

List of medalists

See also
 Asian Water Polo Championship
 Asian Water Polo Cup
 Asian Swimming Championships

References
 All Asian Games Results

External links
Medallists from previous Asian Games - Water polo

 
Sports at the Asian Games
Asian Games
Asian Games